Joseph Höffner (24 December 1906 – 16 October 1987) was a German cardinal of the Roman Catholic Church. He served as the Archbishop of Cologne from 1969 to 1987 and was elevated to the cardinalate in 1969.

Biography
Born in Horhausen, Höffner attended the seminary in Freiburg im Breisgau and the Pontifical Gregorian University in Rome before being ordained to the priesthood by Cardinal Francesco Marchetti-Selvaggiani on 30 October 1932. Having already earned a doctorate of philosophy in 1929, Höffner earned a doctorate of theology in Rome in 1934, another doctorate of theology in Freiburg im Breisgau in 1938, a degree in economics in 1939 and a doctorate in political science in 1940. After 1934, he also did pastoral work in Trier until 1945. After teaching at the Trier seminary for six years, Höffner was named to the University of Münster in 1951. He was the founder, director, and a professor of the Institute of Christian Social Sciences in Munich from 1951 to 1961, and was also a scientific advisor to three ministries of the Federal Republic.

On 9 July 1962, Höffner was appointed Bishop of Münster. He received his episcopal consecration on the following 14 September from Bishop Matthias Wehr, with Bishops Heinrich Baaken and Heinrich Tenhumberg serving as co-consecrators. Höffner attended the Second Vatican Council from 1962 to 1965, and was promoted to Coadjutor Archbishop of Cologne and Titular Archbishop of Aquileia on 6 January 1969. He succeeded Josef Frings as Archbishop of Cologne on 24 February of that same year.

Höffner was created Cardinal-Priest of Sant'Andrea della Valle by Pope Paul VI in the consistory of 28 April 1969. From 1976 to 1987, he was Chairman of the Conference of the German Bishops and thus the highest representative of the Catholic Church in Germany. The German prelate was one of the cardinal electors who participated in the conclaves of August and October 1978, which selected Pope John Paul I and Pope John Paul II respectively. Höffner resigned as Cologne's archbishop on 14 September 1987, after a period of seventeen years.

Höffner died the next month in Cologne at age 80, and is buried in the Cologne Cathedral. An expert in Catholic social doctrine, he was awarded the posthumous honor of "Righteous Among the Nations" in 2003 by the State of Israel, for having saved Jewish lives during World War II. The Deutsche Post honored him in 2006, on the occasion of his 100th birthday, with a stamp, which included his photo and episcopal motto "Justitia et Caritas".

In a 2007, the Archdiocese of Cologne indicated their intention to open the cause of beatification for Höffner.

References

External links

Catholic-Hierarchy
Hagiography Circle

1906 births
1987 deaths
People from the Rhine Province
20th-century German cardinals
Archbishops of Cologne
Roman Catholic bishops of Münster
Participants in the Second Vatican Council
Burials at Cologne Cathedral
Cardinals created by Pope Paul VI
Academic staff of the University of Münster
Roman Catholics in the German Resistance
German Righteous Among the Nations
Grand Crosses 1st class of the Order of Merit of the Federal Republic of Germany